Wayne Arthurs and Leander Paes were the defending champions, but none competed this year. Arthurs decided to focus on the singles tournament.

Jonathan Erlich and Harel Levy won the title by defeating Kyle Spencer and Mitch Sprengelmeyer 7–6(7–2), 7–5 in the final.

Seeds

Draw

Draw

References
 Official Results Archive (ATP)
 Official Results Archive (ITF)

2000 Hall of Fame Tennis Championships